The 42nd General Assembly of Prince Edward Island was in session from March 2, 1932, to June 15, 1935. The Conservative Party led by James David Stewart formed the government. William J. P. MacMillan became Premier and party leader following Stewart's death in 1933.

Augustine A. MacDonald was elected speaker. Heath Strong became speaker in 1934.

There were four sessions of the 42nd General Assembly:

Members

Kings

Prince

Queens

Notes:

References
  Election results for the Prince Edward Island Legislative Assembly, 1931-08-06
 O'Handley, Kathryn Canadian Parliamentary Guide, 1994 

Terms of the General Assembly of Prince Edward Island
1932 establishments in Prince Edward Island
1935 disestablishments in Prince Edward Island